The 1959–1960 Saint Louis Hawks season was the 14th season for the franchise in the National Basketball Association (NBA). The Hawks claimed their 4th straight division title. They won the division by 16 games with a 46–29 record. Bob Pettit, Cliff Hagan, and Clyde Lovellette all averaged more than 20 points per game. In the Western Finals, the Hawks faced the Minneapolis Lakers and needed a win in Game 6 to stay alive. Game 6 was played in Minneapolis and the Hawks dominated the Lakers, as they won the match by 21 points to force a 7th game. In St. Louis the Hawks won 97–86 to earn a trip to the NBA Finals. The Hawks challenged the Boston Celtics for the 3rd time in 4 years. The Hawks and Celtics alternated wins as the series went to a 7th game. In Game 7 the Celtics would claim the title as Bill Russell scored 18 points in the 2nd Quarter.

Roster

<noinclude>

Regular season

Season standings

Record vs. opponents

Game log

Playoffs

|- align="center" bgcolor="#ccffcc"
| 1
| March 16
| Minneapolis
| W 112–99
| Cliff Hagan (29)
| Bob Pettit (19)
| Kiel Auditorium8,377
| 1–0
|- align="center" bgcolor="#ffcccc"
| 2
| March 17
| Minneapolis
| L 113–120
| Clyde Lovellette (30)
| Bob Pettit (15)
| Kiel Auditorium8,614
| 1–1
|- align="center" bgcolor="#ccffcc"
| 3
| March 19
| @ Minneapolis
| W 93–89
| Bob Pettit (35)
| —
| Minneapolis Armory
| 2–1
|- align="center" bgcolor="#ffcccc"
| 4
| March 20
| @ Minneapolis
| L 101–103
| Cliff Hagan (28)
| Clyde Lovellette (15)
| Minneapolis Armory6,852
| 2–2
|- align="center" bgcolor="#ffcccc"
| 5
| March 22
| Minneapolis
| L 110–117 (OT)
| Bob Pettit (25)
| Bob Pettit (19)
| Kiel Auditorium10,043
| 2–3
|- align="center" bgcolor="#ccffcc"
| 6
| March 24
| @ Minneapolis
| W 117–96
| Bob Pettit (30)
| Bob Pettit (18)
| Minneapolis Armory
| 3–3
|- align="center" bgcolor="#ccffcc"
| 7
| March 26
| Minneapolis
| W 97–86
| Bob Pettit (28)
| Bob Pettit (20)
| Kiel Auditorium6,195
| 4–3
|-

|- align="center" bgcolor="#ffcccc"
| 1
| March 27
| @ Boston
| L 122–140
| Cliff Hagan (25)
| Bob Pettit (17)
| Johnny McCarthy (6)
| Boston Garden10,002
| 0–1
|- align="center" bgcolor="#ccffcc"
| 2
| March 29
| @ Boston
| W 113–103
| Bob Pettit (35)
| Bob Pettit (22)
| Bob Pettit (7)
| Boston Garden13,909
| 1–1
|- align="center" bgcolor="#ffcccc"
| 3
| April 2
| Boston
| L 86–102
| Bob Pettit (23)
| Bob Pettit (18)
| Green, Lovellette (6)
| Kiel Auditorium10,612
| 1–2
|- align="center" bgcolor="#ccffcc"
| 4
| April 3
| Boston
| W 106–96
| Bob Pettit (32)
| Bob Pettit (11)
| Johnny McCarthy (8)
| Kiel Auditorium10,612
| 2–2
|- align="center" bgcolor="#ffcccc"
| 5
| April 5
| @ Boston
| L 102–127
| Cliff Hagan (28)
| Cliff Hagan (12)
| Si Green (8)
| Boston Garden13,909
| 2–3
|- align="center" bgcolor="#ccffcc"
| 6
| April 7
| Boston
| W 105–102
| Cliff Hagan (36)
| Clyde Lovellette (15)
| Johnny McCarthy (9)
| Kiel Auditorium10,612
| 3–3
|- align="center" bgcolor="#ffcccc"
| 7
| April 9
| @ Boston
| L 103–122
| Bob Pettit (22)
| Bob Pettit (14)
| Si Green (5)
| Boston Garden13,909
| 3–4
|-

Awards and honors
Bob Pettit, All-NBA First Team

References

Hawks on Basketball Reference

Atlanta Hawks seasons
St. Louis
St. Louis Hawks
St. Louis Hawks